Momeik, also known as Mong Mit in Shan, is a town situated on the Shweli River in northern Shan State of Myanmar (Burma).

Transport
It is connected by road to Mogok and its ruby mines, and via Mogok to Mandalay, and to Kyaukme which is on the Mandalay-Lashio railway line. Momeik is also linked to Myitkyina, capital of Kachin State via Mabein and Bhamo. There is an airport for domestic flights to Momeik.

Whereas Mogok lies at an elevation of 4,000 ft, Momeik is just 800 ft above sea level and 28 miles to the north of Mogok. Sixty miles by road to the west of Mogok lie Twinnge Village and the town of Thabeikkyin on the Ayeyarwady River (Irrawaddy). There is now a direct road linking Twinnge with Momeik.

History

Momeik, part of the state of Hsenwi, was founded in 1238. Thirteen villages of the Mogok Stone Tract were given to Momeik in 1420 as a reward for helping Yunnan raid Chiang Mai. In 1465, Nang Han Lung, the daughter-in-law of the Saopha (Sawbwa in Burmese) of Momeik, sent ruby as separate tribute from Hsenwi and succeeded in keeping the former possessions of Hsenwi until 1484 when Mogok was ceded to the Burmese kings. It was however not until 1597 that the Saopha of Momeik was forced to exchange Mogok and Kyatpyin with Tagaung, and they were formally annexed by royal edict.

Earlier in 1542, when the Shan ruler of Ava Thohanbwa (1527–1543) marched with the Saophas of Mohnyin, Hsipaw, Momeik, Mogaung, Bhamo and Yawnghwe to come to the aid of Prome against the Burmese, he was defeated by Bayinnaung. In 1544, Hkonmaing (1543-6), Saopha of Onbaung or Hsipaw and successor to Thohanbwa, attempted to regain Prome, with the help of Mohnyin, Momeik, Monè, Hsenwi, Bhamo and Yawnghwe, only to be defeated by King Tabinshwehti (1512–1550).

Bayinnaung succeeded in three campaigns, 1556-9, to reduce the Shan states of Mohnyin, Mogaung, Momeik, Mong Pai (Mobyè), Saga, Lawksawk (Yatsauk), Yawnghwe, Hsipaw, Bhamo, Kalay, Chiang Mai, and Linzin (Vientiane), before he raided up the Taping and Shweli Rivers in 1562.

A bell donated by King Bayinnaung (1551–1581) at Shwezigon Pagoda in Bagan has inscriptions in Burmese, Pali and Mon recording the conquest of Momeik and Hsipaw on 25 January 1557, and the building of a pagoda at Momeik on 8 February 1557.

British rule
The Saopha of Momeik had just died at the time of the British annexation in 1885 leaving a minor as heir, and the administration at Momeik was weak. It was included under the jurisdiction of the Commissioner of the Northern Division instead of the Superintendent of the Northern Shan States. A pretender named Hkam Leng came to claim the title, but he was rejected by the ministers. A Burmese prince called Saw Yan Naing, who had risen up against the British, fled to the area and joined forces with Hkam Leng, and caused a great deal of problems during 1888-9 to the Hampshire Regiment stationed at Momeik.

Sao Hkun Hkio, Saopha of Momeik, was one of the seven Saophas on the Executive Committee of the Shan State Council formed after the first Panglong Conference in March 1946. On 16 January 1947, they sent two memoranda, whilst a Burmese delegation headed by Aung San was in London, to the British Labour government of Clement Attlee demanding equal political footing as Burma proper and full autonomy of the Federated Shan States. He was not one of the six Saophas who signed the Panglong Agreement on 12 February 1947. The Cambridge-educated Sao Hkun Hkio however became the longest serving Foreign Minister of Burma after independence in 1948 until the military coup of Ne Win in 1962, with only short interruptions, the longest one of which being between 1958 and 1960 during Ne Win's caretaker government.

After independence
The Shweli river valley and the hills around Momeik and Mogok are old strongholds of the Communist Party of Burma (CPB) as early as the 1950s, but it was not until 1968 that the 1st Brigade of the CPB People's Army regained control of the area, and briefly captured Momeik itself in 1977. Their plan to strike west to the plains north of Mandalay however was thwarted by clashes with the Shan State Army and the Palaung State Liberation Army as well as government military offensives.

The Shan State Army-North's 3rd Brigade has been active in Momeik, Kyaukme, Hsipaw, Namtu and Lashio. It reached a cease-fire agreement with the Burmese military government (SLORC) in 1989, and its activities have been severely curtailed. In 2005, an attempt by the Shan State Army-South based near the Thai border to fill the vacuum left by the cease-fire in the north was thwarted by the Burmese army.

Economy

Minerals
Momeik is famous for its precious and semi-precious stones in its own right. Elbaite, a variant of Rubellite (Tourmaline or Anyant meaning 'inferior' in Burmese) including the "mushroom" tourmaline, and Petalite or Salinwa are mined in this region.

Diamond found in Momeik region is believed to be derived from primary sources in north-western Australia but distinguishable from similar stones from eastern Australia. Gold mining in the area is being operated by Asia World and Shweli Yadana companies.

Agriculture
Mogok ruby mines rely on the staple Momeik rice. Hsinshweli strain high-yield rice as well as sugar cane, rubber, physic nut, jengkol bean and avocado are cultivated in the region.

Notes

External links
Satellite map GeoNames
Tourmaline "Rubellite", Burma Momeik Finest Minerals
Elbaite (Rubellite) Fabre Minerals
High yield rice yields low S.H.A.N.

Populated places in Shan State